The men's individual golf event at the 2017 Summer Universiade was held 24–26 August at the Sunrise Golf and Country Club in Taoyuan, Taiwan.

Final results

References 

Men's individual